Juuso Runtti (2 March 1854 – 16 April 1927) was a Finnish farmer, lay preacher and politician, born in Kiiminki. He was a Member of the Parliament of Finland, representing the Finnish Party from 1907 to 1908 and from 1916 to 1918 and the National Coalition Party from 1918 to 1919.

References

1854 births
1927 deaths
People from Kiiminki
People from Oulu Province (Grand Duchy of Finland)
Finnish Lutherans
Finnish Party politicians
National Coalition Party politicians
Members of the Parliament of Finland (1907–08)
Members of the Parliament of Finland (1916–17)
Members of the Parliament of Finland (1917–19)
People of the Finnish Civil War (White side)